Philani Zulu (born 16 September 1992) is a South African footballer who last played for Amazulu F.C.

References

1985 births
Living people
South African soccer players
Association football midfielders
Maritzburg United F.C. players
Kaizer Chiefs F.C. players
AmaZulu F.C. players
South African Premier Division players